Borówno may refer to the following places in Poland:
Borówno, Lower Silesian Voivodeship (south-west Poland)
Borówno, Bydgoszcz County in Kuyavian-Pomeranian Voivodeship (north-central Poland)
Borówno, Chełmno County in Kuyavian-Pomeranian Voivodeship (north-central Poland)
Borówno, Golub-Dobrzyń County in Kuyavian-Pomeranian Voivodeship (north-central Poland)
Borówno, Warmian-Masurian Voivodeship (north Poland)
Borówno, West Pomeranian Voivodeship (north-west Poland)